is a Japanese football player who lastly played as midfielder for V-Varen Nagasaki.

Career statistics
Updated to 23 February 2017.

References

External links

Profile at V-Varen Nagasaki

1992 births
Living people
Association football people from Tokyo
Japanese footballers
J1 League players
J2 League players
Nagoya Grampus players
Oita Trinita players
V-Varen Nagasaki players
Association football midfielders